Clemens Jehle (born 16 August 1958) is a Swiss judoka. He competed at the 1984 Summer Olympics and the 1988 Summer Olympics.

References

1958 births
Living people
Swiss male judoka
Olympic judoka of Switzerland
Judoka at the 1984 Summer Olympics
Judoka at the 1988 Summer Olympics
Place of birth missing (living people)
20th-century Swiss people